The Oxford-Whitney Streets District is a historic district encompassing an early-20th century residential area in the West End neighborhood of Hartford, Connecticut. It extends along the east side of Oxford Street between Elizabeth and Cone Streets, and along the west side of Whitney between Fern and Elizabeth, and includes the north side of Fern Street between Whitney and Oxford. Most of the housing, a combination of single and multi-family residences, was built between 1906 and 1919, a period later than the surrounding areas, and is predominantly Colonial Revival in character. It was listed on the National Register of Historic Places in 2010.

Description and history
Most of the area that became Oxford and Whitney Streets on Hartford's west side, was farmland and country estates until roughly 1869. In the 1870s it was platted for development by Eugene L. Kenyon, Willis Thrall, and Sylvanus Cone, but development was slowed by financial panics. Albert and Alfred Gillett purchased large tracts in the area in the 1880s, and began development north of a strip near Farmington Avenue. Whitney Street had been laid out by Kenyon in 1870, but was not accepted by the city until 1896, and the portion of Oxford Street between Cone and Elizabeth was laid out by the Gilletts in 1904. These areas were mostly built out with housing aimed at the lower and middle classes, a contrast to the earlier development which had favored upper and upper-middle class buyers.

The historic district is bounded on the north by Elizabeth Street and the south by Cone and Fern Streets. Oxford Street is laid out with slightly larger lot sizes, and has mostly one and two-family buildings. Whitney Street lots are generally smaller, and many of the buildings house more than three units. Most of the buildings are of wood frame construction, although some of these are finished in stucco, and there are a few brick buildings in the district. Almost all are basically Colonial Revival in style and massing, although elements of Prairie, Tudor, Queen Anne and Shingle styling appear throughout the area. There are no non-residential buildings in the district. It is bounded on the south by the National Register-listed Prospect Avenue Historic District.

See also

National Register of Historic Places listings in Hartford, Connecticut

References

Historic districts on the National Register of Historic Places in Connecticut
National Register of Historic Places in Hartford, Connecticut
Colonial Revival architecture in Connecticut
Historic districts in Hartford County, Connecticut